The "Liburnian language" refers to a proposed extinct language which would have been spoken by the ancient Liburnians, who occupied Liburnia, a variously defined region in modern southwestern Croatia, in classical times. Classification of the Liburnian language is not clearly established; it is reckoned as an Indo-European language with a significant proportion of the Pre-Indo-European elements from the wider area of the ancient Mediterranean. Due to the paucity of evidence, the very existence of a distinct 'Liburnian language' must be considered hypothetical at this point.

Classification
No writings in Liburnian are known. The only presumed Liburnian linguistic remains are Liburnian toponyms and some family and personal names in Liburnia presumed to be native to the area, in Latinized form from the 1st century AD. Smaller differences found in the archaeological material of narrower regions in Liburnia are in a certain measure reflected also in these scarce linguistic remains. This has caused much speculation about the language but no certainty.

Features shared by Liburnian and other languages have been noted in Liburnian language remains, names and toponyms, dating from between the Iron Age and the beginning of Common Era. These are insufficient for a precise linguistic classification, other than a general indication that they have an Indo-European basis, but also may incorporate significant elements from Pre-Indo-European languages. This also appears to be the case in their social relations, and such phenomena are likely related to their separate cultural development, physical isolation and mixed ethnic origins.

Following studies of the onomastics of the Roman province of Dalmatia, Géza Alföldy has suggested that the Liburni and Histri belonged to the Venetic language area. In particular, some Liburnian anthroponyms show strong Venetic affinities, a few similar names and common roots, such as Vols-, Volt-, and Host- (< PIE *ghos-ti- 'stranger, guest, host'). Liburnian and Venetic names sometimes also share suffixes in common, such as -icus and -ocus.

Jürgen Untermann, who has focused on Liburnian and Venetic onomastics, considers that only the Liburnians at the north-eastern Istrian coast were strongly Venetic. Untermann has suggested three groups of Liburnian names: one structurally similar to those of the Veneti and Histri; another linked to the Dalmatae, Iapodes and other Illyrians on the mainland to the south of the Liburnians, and a third group of names that were common throughout Liburnian territory, and lacked any relation to those of their neighbors.

Other proper names, such as those of local deities and toponyms also showed differing regional distributions. According to R. Katičić,  Liburnian toponyms, in both structure and form, also demonstrate diverse influences, including Pre-Indo-European, Indo-European and other, purely local features. Katičić has also stated that toponyms were distributed separately along ethnic and linguistic lines. 

S. Čače has noted that it can not be determined whether Liburnian was more related to the North Adriatic language group (Veneti, Histri) or the languages of Iapodes and Dalmatae, due to the scarcity of evidence. While the Liburnians differed significantly from the Histri and Veneti, both culturally and ethnically, they have been linked to the Dalmatae by their burial traditions. 

Other toponymical and onomastic similarities have been found between Liburnia and other regions of both Illyria and Asia Minor, especially Lycia, Lydia, Caria, Pisidia, Isauria, Pamphylia, Lycaonia and Cilicia, as well as similarities in elements of social organization, such as matriarchy/gynecocracy (gynaikokratia) and the numerical organization of territory. These are also features of the wider Adriatic region, especially Etruria, Messapia and southern Italy. Toponymical and onomastic connections to Asia Minor may also indicate a Liburnian presence amongst the Sea Peoples.

The old toponym Liburnum in Liguria may also link the Liburnian name to the Etruscans, as well as the proposed Tyrsenian language family.

The Liburnians underwent Romanization after being conquered by the Romans in 35 BCE. The Liburnian language was replaced by Latin, and underwent language death –most likely during Late Antiquity. The Liburnians nevertheless retained some of  their cultural traditions until the 4th century CE,  especially in the larger cities – a fact attested by archaeology.

Onomastics

Anthroponyms
The single name plus patronymic formula common among Illyrians is rare among Liburnians. In a region where the Roman three-name formula (praenomen, nomen gentile, cognomen: Caius Julius Caesar) spread at an early date, a native two-name formula appears in several variants.

Acaica
Aetor
Avitus (masc.), Avita (fem.)
Boninus
Cliticus
Colatina
Curticus
Darmo
Dumma
Hosp(olis)
Hostiducis (gen.)
Hostiices
Lambicus
Malavicus
Marica
Menda
Moicus
Oclatinus
Oeplus
Opia
Opiavus
Oplus
Plaetor, gen. Plaetoris. Found among the Veneti as Plaetorius; among the Illyrians as Plator, genitive Platoris. Attested as Pletor in an inscription found in the area of Ljubljana in Slovenia.
Patalius
Recus
Suioca
Tarnis
Toruca
Trosius
Turus
Vadica
Velsouna (fem.)
Viniocus
Volaesa
Volscus
Volsetis (gen.)
Volso
Volsonus
Volsounus (masc.), Volsouna (fem.)
Volsus
Voltimesis (gen.)
Vol(l)tis(s)a
Zupricus

The majority of the preceding names are unknown among the eastern and southern neighbors of the Liburnians (Dalmatae, etc.), yet many have Venetic complements. The following names are judged to be exclusively Liburnian, yet one (Buzetius) is also attested among the neighboring Iapodes to the north and northeast:

Aeia
Barcinus
Buzetius
Caminis (gen.)
Ceunus
Clausus
Granp (...). Attested only in abbreviated form.
Iaefus
Lastimeis (gen. ?)
Mamaester
Pasinus
Picusus
Tetenus
Vesclevesis (gen.). - The etymology is established. It is a compound, the initial element Ves-, from PIE *u̯esu- ('good'); the second element -cleves- (genitive suffix -is) from PIE *ḱleuos ('fame', ultimately from *ḱleu- 'to hear').

Virno

Theonyms
Anzotica - the Liburnian Venus.

Toponyms

See also
Venetic language
Italic languages
Illyrian languages

References

Sources
Wilkes, John. The Illyrians. Blackwell Books, 1992.
Untermann, J., Venetisches in Dalmatien, Godišnjak (Annuaire) CBI, Sarejevo. 5, 5-22.

Extinct languages of Europe
Unclassified languages of Europe
Liburnia